Leif Martin Holmgren (born May 25, 1953 in Kiruna, Sweden) is a former Swedish ice hockey player.

Playing career
Holmgren spent the majority of his career, which began in 1971, with AIK.  His best season came in 1977–78, scoring 21 goals and 31 points in 32 games.  He was then named into the Swedish All-Star Team in 1979, having contributed 18 assists as well as scoring 11 goals for 29 points. As a member of AIK, Holmgren won the Elitserien playoff championship in 1982 and 1984 as well as the regular season championship also in 1984. Afterwards, Holmgren moved to the Allsvenskan and signed with Vallentuna BK where he scored 32 points with 17 goals to his credit. He then return to AIK for one last season before retiring in 1986.

International play
Holmgren played in three Ice Hockey World Championships for Sweden, winning a bronze medal in 1979.  He also won a bronze medal at the 1980 Winter Olympics.

External links

Olympic Info

1953 births
Living people
AIK IF players
Ice hockey players at the 1980 Winter Olympics
Olympic bronze medalists for Sweden
Olympic ice hockey players of Sweden
Olympic medalists in ice hockey
People from Kiruna Municipality
Swedish ice hockey centres
Medalists at the 1980 Winter Olympics
Sportspeople from Norrbotten County